The Men's omnium competition at the 2020 UCI Track Cycling World Championships was held on 29 February 2020.

Results

Scratch race
The race was started at 12:12.

Tempo race
The tempo race was started at 14:35.

Elimination race
The elimination race was started at 17:51.

Points race and overall standings
The race was started at 19:02.

References

Men's omnium
UCI Track Cycling World Championships – Men's omnium